The Neenah Nodaway Yacht Club (NNYC) is based in Neenah, Wisconsin and was established in 1864. This makes it one of the oldest yacht clubs in the country. Since its formation the NNYC has been committed to promoting sailing for individuals of all ages through sponsorships of club racing and cruising for a wide variety of boats. NNYC participates in Lake Winnebago events, helping to support the Fox Valley Sailing School and many other community events. When the NNYC was formed it set out to accomplish several goals:

 To promote pleasure sailing and racing on Lake Winnebago.
 To establish a standard code of rules and signals for the Lake.
 To discourage extravagant expenditure in yachting.

History
The documented history of yacht racing on Lake Winnebago dates from 1859. In that year, the first racing yacht on record at the northern end of Lake Winnebago, the "Mayflower" was built in Menasha for Charles Doty, a son of the former territorial governor of Wisconsin.

The first recorded reference to a Neenah Yacht Club was in 1863 when it was mentioned in the press as having won the lake championship. Lloyd's Register of American Yachts gives the club's founding date as 1864. Between the years 1867 and 1869, Oshkosh and Fond du Lac formed yachting clubs and racing between yachts representing these cities began in earnest.

The pride of the Neenah Yacht Club in the 1870s was the "Minnie Graves." Her most famous race of the decade was won off Oshkosh in July 1873. Large crowds lined the shores the day of the race, others followed the race from lake steamers, sailboats and rowboats. A professional skipper, Eb Stevens, piloted the Minnie Graves, but one of the crew members was Captain Hank Haff, later a defender of the America's Cup. Minnie was shy a hand that day, so the crew dumped a bag of gravel overboard and invited the stranger aboard.

During the eighties, yachting activity on the lake began to wane. Although there were others who had success during the period, Neenah's fortunes were, in J. C. Kimberly's words "down in the trough of the wave."

In the spring of 1893 the one design concept was brought to Neenah by William Z. Stuart. The Yosida, a sixteen-foot catyawl with few pretensions was destined to make yachting history. The Yosida was seaworthy and easily handled, and captivated the interest of local residents. In February 1894, Stuard called a meeting at his home. Those present in addition to Stuart, were John A. Kimberly, Jr., James C. Kimberly, Edward P. Sherry, James H. Wright, Lucius K. Henry and from Appleton, T. W. Orbison and W. L. Conkey. James C. Kimberly was unanimously elected commodore of what was to be named the Nodawa Boat Club. The original list of suggested names for the club came from an imposing list of over 500 yacht names. The name Nodawa was the unanimous choice of the group, and the full title of the club was the Nodawa Boat Club. However, in a few months and without a formal vote, Nodawa became "Nodaway" and that fall, when registration of the club was proposed, "Boat" was changed to "Yacht," so that by the end of the season the official name of the organization was Nodaway Yacht Club.

Even before its first anniversary, however, the club began to broaden its interests. The six original catyawls continued to compete as a class, new members joined, and soon larger boats were acquired. Of these, the most noted was the thirty foot 
"skimming dish" Nirvana, the first Neenah yacht to win the Felker Cup.

The Neenah Nodaway Yacht Club was formed in 1905, when the two local clubs merged. At that time, activity centered around the class A scows, with J. C. Kimberly winning the Felker Cup in 1905.

With a repeal of the ILYA one entry per club rule, their annual regatta re-blossomed and was held at the Oshkosh Yacht Club. World War I put a damper on yacht racing and the regatta was cancelled in 1917 and 1918. Interest revived in 1921 when new life was injected into the A fleet by three veteran sailors, Will Davis, James C. Kimberly, and Frank Shattuck. A new generation of skippers was introduced that year, including Leo Schubart, Horace DuBois, Lyall and Irving Stilp, Jack Kimberly, and Bill Kellett.

In 1923 the Inland regatta was held in Neenah for the first time. Racing conditions and organization were near perfect for the event. The club sponsored several Inland regattas between 1927 and 1964.

The Depression of the 1930s put Neenah racing into a decline, but club activities continued with emphasis placed on junior sailing in dinghies, and later in the ILYA Cub class, and its successor, the X. Under the direction of the new commodore, Bill Kellett, an active promotion program was begun in 1937. New trophies were added to stimulate racing activity.

Though Class A yachts and the Inland regattas were still in the limelight, by the end of the 1930s a fast-growing fleet of smaller craft, piloted by juniors and seniors, was nudging the big boats over for a share of the stage. In 1941 membership reached 148, and the NNYC fleet of smaller craft, piloted by juniors and seniors was nudging the big boats over for a share of the stage. In 1941 membership reached 148, and the NNYC fleet set up a record for activity, with 69 boats on the lake, 53 participating in racing and 35 eligible for awards.

The onset of World War II saw another reduction in racing activity, however activity was maintained by the juniors, during this time. The club sponsored on the water training for V-12 Navy College Training Program students from the Lawrence University campus, many of whom had never been on a boat.

A Scow activity resumed after the war, but more significant as a portent of things to come was the growth in the fleets of smaller Class D and F scows, and in the Lightning class. The latter begun in 1942 by Dick Neller. The popular day sailor-racer was never recognized by the ILYA, but was well suited to Winnebago sailing.

The big news events of the 1950s were Bill Kellett's victories aboard Last Chance in the Class A series at the Inland regattas of 1951 and 1953, the first for NNYC sailors since W.I., Davis' Class A championship more than a half century earlier. Kellett won again in 1962 in a new 1961 Johnson Class A scow, Winnefox II.

The trend to smaller boats and from wooden hulls to fiberglass was not to be denied. Though the Catlin brothers won an A scow championship in Mad Zephyr in 1966, with Tim steering, and Bill Kellett's son Buzz skippered Winnefox II to her second ILYA crown the following year, the A scow era at Neenah was ending. Eric Isakson took the Felker Cup in 1967 aboard his White Star, and competed with success in several more Inland regattas, but the giant A scows, the "varsity" of the ILYA, no longer competed on the NNYC course.

By the mid sixties these fleets were supplanted by the newer fiberglass hulled M-20 class, a scow version of the Flying Dutchman, designed by Melges. ILYA championships in this sporty class were held by John Rather in 1966 and Geoff Catlin in 1967. Although the fleet has fluctuated in size, it has generally provided the most competitive racing available to Neenah sailors since the demise of the Class A fleet locally.

The Flying Scot fleet has taken the place of the Lightning in recent years. From a small fleet of four boats in 1972, this class of 19 foot family day sailor-racers grew to 23 yachts by the start of the 1976 season, largely as the result of promotional efforts by Terry Schoreder, who scoured the Midwest looking for used Scots to supply local demand for boats of the popular class.

A 24-boat Laser fleet sprang into being for the 1976 season, drawing interest from many new sailors as well as those from other classes who wanted to sharpen their tactical skills.

The cruising fleet has been the greatest long term growth in the club's history. It numbered 53 boats by the start of the 1976 season. These ranged in size from the "trailer sailors" to large auxiliaries capable of sailing anywhere in the world. NNYC sailors achieved racing success in the cruising class not only in local club races, and events sponsored by the LWSA but also on Green Bay.

Formal establishment of the sailing school served as a stimulus for junior sailing during this era. Karrie Galloway served as sailing master during the development of the broadened program in 1970 and 1971. She was followed by Janet Apple in 1972 and 1973 and Adrienne Dick in the subsequent years. Adult instruction was not neglected during this period. Pre-season classroom sessions were conducted at the Neenah YMCA by Bud Dick, Gus Larson, Joel Ungrodt, Dieter Kutscha and Owen Felton. Occasionally, guest speakers conducted seminars, including Buddy Melges, Peter Barrett and Bruce Goldsmith. The Fox Valley Sailing School continued to grow, reaching an enrollment of over 120 by 1980 and maintaining approximately that level through 1984. The school also developed its own fleet of X-Boats as a result of donations by NNYC members. With it came an increased need for maintenance, a function which Geoff Catlin was willing and able to fill.

The club now has over 100 yachts in the harbor, including three international fleets. These include J/24s, Flying Scots, and Lasers.

External links
 Official Website

1864 establishments in Wisconsin
Sailing in Wisconsin
Yacht clubs in the United States